Ultramix is a series of Dance Dance Revolution music video games developed by Konami

In video games:
Dance Dance Revolution Ultramix
Dance Dance Revolution Ultramix 2
Dance Dance Revolution Ultramix 3
Dance Dance Revolution Ultramix 4
Dancing Stage Unleashed, the European branded series based on Dance Dance Revolution Ultramix
Dancing Stage Unleashed 2
Dancing Stage Unleashed 3

In music:
"Stakeout (Ultra:mix)", a remix of the Freezepop song used in Dance Dance Revolution Ultramix 3